The  are a group of structures in the precincts of the Tokyo Imperial Palace in Japan. They are used in imperial religious ceremonies, including weddings and enthronements. 

The three sanctuaries are:
 Kashiko-dokoro (賢所) – the central shrine, enshrining a replica of the mirror Yata no Kagami, representing the mythological ancestress of the Imperial Family, Amaterasu. (For the enthronements in Kyoto of Emperor Taishō in 1915 and of Emperor Shōwa in 1928, the mirror was transported by special rolling stock known as the Kashiko-dokoro Jōgyosha (賢所乗御車) from the name of this sanctuary.) The Yasakani no magatama or Sacred Jewel, one of the Imperial Regalia of Japan, is also said to be housed in the Kashiko-dokoro.
 Kōrei-den (皇霊殿) – the Ancestral Spirits Sanctuary, enshrining the departed spirits of the Imperial Family from one year after their death.
 Shin-den (神殿) – the Sanctuary of the Kami, enshrining the Amatsukami (天津神) from Takamagahara and the Kunitsukami (国津神) from Japanese mythology.

See also 
 Japanese Imperial Rituals
 Culture of Japan
 Japanese mythology
 Jinja (Shinto)
 Religion in Japan

References
 Article on Kyūchū sanden from the Encyclopedia of Shinto
 Kenkyusha's New Japanese-English Dictionary, Kenkyusha Limited, 
 Ono, Sokyo, Shinto: The Kami Way, Charles E. Tuttle Company, Tokyo 1992, 

Tokyo Imperial Palace
Shinto in Tokyo
Religious buildings and structures in Japan
Religious buildings and structures completed in 1888
Japanese Imperial Rituals